Gustow is a municipality in the Vorpommern-Rügen district, in Mecklenburg-Vorpommern, Germany.

History 

The place name comes from the Slavic Gostov and means "place of Gost". Until the 18th century the farm and village belonged to von den Ostens at Plüggentin. In 1324 Vitslav III sold a widow from Barnekow a pension, which fell in 1330 to Bergen auf Rügen Abbey.

References

External links

Official website of Gustow

Towns and villages on Rügen